Liepāja International Airport  is a regional airport in western Latvia which is certified for international air traffic. Along with Riga International Airport and Ventspils Airport, it is one of the three major airports in Latvia.

Overview

On September 20, 2016, the airport was recertified for handling commercial flights after a gap of eight years.  On December 5, 2016, airBaltic conducted a test flight from Riga to Liepāja using their Bombardier CS300 aircraft.  On December 6, 2016, it was announced that they would be conducting a further series of test flights in spring 2017. Flights to Riga began in 2017 with a Bombardier Dash 8 Q400, between three and five times weekly, but ended in 2020 due to the COVID-19 pandemic and AirBaltic's fleet transition.

History 
Early during the Cold War, the airfield was a Soviet Anti-Air Defense base. Its aircraft shot down a U.S. Air Force PB4Y-2 Privateer BuNo 59645 on April 8, 1950.

The airport was closed from 20 September 2014 for infrastructure reconstruction works; re-opening on 25 May 2016; fully operational status is from September 2016.

Airlines and destinations

As of 31 March 2022, there are no regular passenger flights to/from Liepāja airport.

Statistics

See also
List of airports in Latvia
Transportation in Latvia

References

External links
Liepāja International Airport 

South Kurzeme Municipality
Airports in Latvia
Courland